Daryl Franklin Hohl (born October 11, 1946), known professionally as Daryl Hall, is an American rock, R&B and soul singer and musician, best known as the co-founder and principal lead vocalist of Daryl Hall and John Oates (with guitarist and songwriter John Oates).  Outside of his work in Hall & Oates, he has also released five solo albums, including the 1980 progressive rock collaboration with guitarist Robert Fripp titled Sacred Songs and the 1986 album Three Hearts in the Happy Ending Machine,  which provided his best selling single, "Dreamtime", that peaked at number five on the Billboard Hot 100.  He has also collaborated on numerous works by other artists, such as Fripp's 1979 release Exposure, and Dusty Springfield's 1995 album A Very Fine Love, which produced a UK Top 40 hit with "Wherever Would I Be".  Since late 2007, he has hosted the streaming television series Live from Daryl's House, in which he performs alongside other artists, doing a mix of songs from each's catalog.  The show has been rebroadcast on a number of cable and satellite channels as well.

In the 1970s and early 1980s, Hall scored numerous Billboard chart hits and is regarded as one of the best soul singers of his generation. Fripp, who worked with Hall several times, has written, "Daryl's pipes were a wonder. I have never worked with a more able singer." He was inducted into the Songwriters Hall of Fame in 2004 and the Rock and Roll Hall of Fame in April 2014.

Early life and career
Hall was born in Pottstown, a Pennsylvania borough  from Philadelphia, to a family of German descent. His parents each had a background in music; his father came from a choral-group clan and his mother was a vocal coach. He started recording while still a student at Owen J. Roberts High School, from which he graduated in 1964. In college at Temple University in Philadelphia, he majored in music, while continuing to record, working with Kenny Gamble and Leon Huff as both an artist and a session musician.  During his first semester at Temple, in the fall of 1965, he and four other Temple University students formed the vocal harmony group the Temptones.

They were popular additions to the largely black Philly soul scene, defeating both The Ambassadors and The Delfonics in a contest at the Uptown Theater. The Temptones recorded a handful of singles for Arctic Records, produced by Jimmy Bishop. While performing at the Uptown Theater, Hall formed creative affiliations with such artists as Smokey Robinson, The Temptations, and many other top soul singers of the 1960s.

In 1967, Hall met John Oates, who was also an undergraduate at Temple University. According to Daryl Hall, they met when "We got in the middle of a fight at a dance – I have no idea what the fight was about. I guess the Greek letters on one gang's jackets didn't appeal to the other gang. We both beat it out the back and met on the elevator while leaving the place rather quickly." Hall was by then a senior, while Oates was a freshman. They played together until Oates transferred to a different school at age 19. Hall did not let Oates' departure discourage him from pursuing his own musical career: he dropped out of college in 1968 and worked with Tim Moore in a short-lived rock band, Gulliver, and released an album on the Elektra Records label. He was a member of the studio group behind the project Electric Indian whose song "Keem-O-Sabe" became a big hit in 1969. In 1969 Hall again began recording songs by other artists, which led to the duo Hall & Oates signing their first record contract in early 1972.

Daryl Hall and John Oates

Signed to Atlantic by Ahmet Ertegun and managed by Tommy Mottola in the early 1970s, Daryl Hall and John Oates have sold more albums than any other duo in music history. Their second album, Abandoned Luncheonette, produced by Arif Mardin and released in 1973, yielded the single "She's Gone", which went to No. 7 in the U.S. Top 10 on re-release in 1976 after reaching No. 1 on the R&B charts when it was covered by Tavares. The duo recorded one more album with Atlantic, War Babies (produced by Todd Rundgren), before they were dropped and promptly signed to RCA. During their tenure at RCA the duo catapulted to international superstardom.

From the mid-1970s to the mid-1980s, Daryl Hall and John Oates scored six U.S. No. 1 singles, including "Rich Girl" (also No. 1 R&B), "Kiss on My List", "Private Eyes", "I Can't Go for That (No Can Do)" (also No. 1 R&B), "Maneater" and "Out of Touch" from their six multi-platinum albums – Bigger Than Both of Us, Voices, Private Eyes, H2O, Rock 'n Soul Part 1 and Big Bam Boom – the last five of which were released consecutively. The era also produced an additional six U.S. Top 10 singles, "Sara Smile", "One on One", "Family Man," "You Make My Dreams," "Say It Isn't So" and "Method of Modern Love".

In 1972, Daryl Hall and John Oates opened for David Bowie, who was performing in his first tour of the United States as his stage persona Ziggy Stardust.

Later in 1985 the duo performed at the Philadelphia leg of the seminal Live Aid concert. After their set, the duo returned to the stage to back Mick Jagger and Tina Turner.

The duo released a Christmas album in October 2006 titled Home for Christmas.

The duo were inducted into the Rock and Roll Hall of Fame in 2014.

Solo projects
In addition to his work with Oates, Hall has made music as a solo artist, as well as recording with Robert Fripp in the late 1970s, working on Fripp's critically praised Exposure album from 1979. In 1977 Fripp produced and performed on Hall's debut solo album, the much-acclaimed Sacred Songs. This album was released in 1980.

In 1984 Hall co-wrote and produced, with Arthur Baker, the single "Swept Away" for Diana Ross, which reached US No. 19, US R & B No. 3 and US Dance/Club Play No. 1.

In 1985 he performed two songs during the first Farm Aid concert in Champaign, Illinois. Hall participated in the We Are the World session as well as closing the Live Aid show in Philadelphia. He also made an album with Dave Stewart that year, Three Hearts in the Happy Ending Machine, which yielded his #5 solo single "Dreamtime". He has recorded such solo works as Soul Alone in 1993 and Can't Stop Dreaming in 1996, both of which were received well internationally. In 1994 composed "Gloryland" that was official album of the 1994 FIFA World Cup.

In 2007 Hall guest-starred on the HBO series Flight of the Conchords, playing an MC of a "world music" festival.

On March 12, 2008, Hall played a well-received set with his band at the South by Southwest festival in Austin, Texas.

Hall was slated to sing the National Anthem of the United States before Game 5 of the 2008 World Series at Philadelphia's Citizens Bank Park but, due to an illness, could not appear, and Oates sang it instead.

In 2009, Hall guest starred as himself on the Independent Film Channel series, Z-Rock.

In 2010 Hall was back in the studio working on a solo recording with bassist and musical director T-Bone Wolk. Wolk died of a heart attack on February 28, 2010, hours after completing a session with Hall. Hall released a statement about the death of his bassist of nearly 30 years: "It's not if I will go on, but how? T-Bone was one of the most sensitive and good human beings that I have ever known."

On June 11, 2010, Hall shared the stage with electronic duo Chromeo for a special late night set at the Bonnaroo Music and Arts Festival. Their set consisted of a mix of both Hall & Oates and Chromeo tracks.

On September 27, 2011, Hall released the album Laughing Down Crying on Verve Records.

On August 12, 2011, UK Electronic duo Nero released their debut album Welcome Reality, which features guest vocals by Hall on the track "Reaching Out", which also samples Hall & Oates' 1980s hit "Out of Touch". "Reaching Out" was released as the sixth single on December 6, 2011.

Home restoration
Hall restores and preserves historic homes in both the United States and England. In 2008, he purchased the 18th century Bray House, in Kittery Point, Maine and is in the process of restoring it. He also has restored a Georgian-style home in London, England, first built in 1740, with direct waterfront access to the River Thames. He purchased two homes located near Hartford, Connecticut – one built in 1771, the other in 1780 – and had them moved to the same property in New York's Dutchess County where they were combined and restored.  After having the houses moved, he discovered that both homes, by coincidence, were connected to the same family. Hall has a home in Charleston, South Carolina.

Hall hosted the 2014 television show Daryl's Restoration Over-Hall on the DIY Network, which showed him and a crew working on restoring one of his homes in Connecticut.

Live from Daryl's House
Since 2007, Hall has hosted the online show/webcast Live from Daryl's House, which features live music acts in a podcast/videocast first from his home in Millerton, New York, and more recently from his club Daryl's House in Pawling, New York. The webcast has featured appearances by Ben Folds, Johnny Rzeznik, CeeLo Green, The O'Jays, Smokey Robinson, KT Tunstall, Joe Walsh, Rob Thomas, Todd Rundgren, Darius Rucker, Eric Hutchinson, Cheap Trick, Aaron Neville, Chuck Prophet, Travie McCoy, Ray Manzarek and Robbie Krieger of The Doors and many others, as well as a holiday special featuring Shelby Lynne and songs from the Hall and Oates release Home for Christmas.

In a June 2008 interview with Blues & Soul magazine, Hall said of the webcast, "For me it was sort of an obvious thing. I've been touring my whole adult life really, and, you know, you can't be EVERYWHERE! Nor do I WANT to be everywhere at this point! I only like to spend so much time per year on the road. So I thought 'Why don't I just do something where anyone who wants to see me anywhere in the world CAN?! And, instead of doing the artist/audience performance-type thing, I wanted to deconstruct it and make the audience more of a fly-on-the-wall kind of observer... I mean, what I've always done onstage is very natural. I talk to the audience and it's a very sitting-roomy kind of thing. So I just thought I'd basically bring that to the web."

Hall hosted WGN America's 2010 New Year's Eve coverage as a Live from Daryl's House  special. The special featured clips of previous episodes. Steve Dahl, a Chicago radio host, praised the special as the best New Year's Eve special on television for 2010–11, though he criticized the show's lack of a live countdown to midnight.

In July 2018, BMG partnered with Hall and Jonathan Wolfson to secure worldwide rights for Live from Daryl's House and will begin producing new segments beginning that fall, the company announced. The agreement includes worldwide rights to the complete run of 82 episodes filmed from 2007–2016, and the company is seeking distribution partners for the new episodes.

Personal life
Hall was married to Bryna Lublin from 1969 to 1972. He converted to Lublin's religion, Judaism, in order to marry her. He has not actively participated in religion since, but has said that he feels more of a connection to Judaism than to his original affiliation, Methodism. While Hall admits to having had a passing interest in the ideas of English occultist, ceremonial magician, artist and writer Aleister Crowley, he does not consider Thelema to be his faith.

Hall had a nearly 30-year relationship with songwriter Sara Allen (the inspiration for the song "Sara Smile", and a frequent collaborator with Hall & Oates), which ended in 2001 for undisclosed reasons. They were never married. The two have remained friends, and Allen briefly appears in a May 2016 episode of Live from Daryl's House.

According to interviews with Hall in the VH1 Behind the Music documentary, the death of Janna Allen, a close musical collaborator and Sara Allen's sister, affected him very deeply.

Hall had one biological child named Darren with Andrea Zabloski from Duluth, Minnesota. According to Hall, he and his son are not close.

Hall was married to Amanda Aspinall, daughter of British gambling mogul John Aspinall, from 2009 to 2015. Aspinall had two children from a previous relationship; her daughter March sang backing vocals on songs "Save Me", "Message to Ya" and "Eyes for You" on Hall's 2011 album, Laughing Down Crying. Amanda Aspinall died in January 2019.

At the age of about 60, Hall contracted Lyme disease.

Hit singles
Daryl Hall and John Oates had six No. 1 hits on the Billboard Hot 100 chart between 1977 and 1984, all six of which were written or co-written by Hall: "Rich Girl", "Kiss on My List" (which Hall wrote with Janna Allen), "Private Eyes" (with Sara Allen, Janna Allen & Warren Pash), "I Can't Go for That (No Can Do)" (with John Oates & Sara Allen), "Maneater" (with John Oates & Sara Allen) and "Out of Touch" (with John Oates). In addition, "Do It For Love" (written with John Oates) and "It Came Upon a Midnight Clear" (by Edmund Hamilton Sears & Richard Storrs Willis) topped the U.S. Adult Contemporary charts. "Everytime You Go Away", written by Hall and featured on the Hall & Oates album Voices, reached No. 1 in the US and Canada in 1985 when covered by Paul Young.

The Daryl Hall and John Oates song "She's Gone", which Hall and Oates co-wrote, reached No. 1 on the Billboard Hot Soul Singles chart when covered by Tavares in 1974.

Hall also sang lead vocals on, and wrote or co-wrote, nine more popular Billboard songs that also made it to the Top 10: "Say It Isn't So", "Adult Education" (with John Oates & Sara Allen), "Sara Smile" (with John Oates – a song that refers to Hall's then-girlfriend), "Method of Modern Love" (with Janna Allen), "You Make My Dreams" (with John Oates & Sara Allen), "Everything Your Heart Desires", "One on One", "Did It in a Minute" (with Sara Allen & Janna Allen) and "So Close" (with George Green).

Hall has also had hits which were cover versions, including reaching No. 12 with his 1980 rendition of The Righteous Brothers' "You've Lost That Loving Feeling"

Discography

Albums

Singles

References

External links
The Official Hall and Oates Website
Live From Daryl's House

1946 births
American multi-instrumentalists
American rock musicians
American soul musicians
American alternative country musicians
American television hosts
Blues rock musicians
Musicians from Philadelphia
Temple University alumni
People from Pottstown, Pennsylvania
People from Montgomery County, Pennsylvania
People from Millerton, New York
Living people
American people of German descent
Singers from Pennsylvania
Hall & Oates members
American soul singers
Converts to Judaism
Jewish singers
Jewish American musicians
Country musicians from New York (state)
Country musicians from Pennsylvania
20th-century American keyboardists
20th-century American male singers
20th-century American singers
21st-century American Jews
Daryl Hall and the Daryl's House Band members